Bulilima District is a district of the Province Matabeleland South in Zimbabwe.

References

Districts of Zimbabwe